The European qualification for the 2021 World Men's Handball Championship, in Egypt, would have been contested by the teams that did not qualify for the 2020 European Men's Handball Championship and the 20 teams that played the tournament but were not pre-qualified or failed to reach a qualifying ranking place. In total, 34 teams were competing for 10 places at the final tournament.

The qualification tournament was cancelled on 24 April 2020 due to the COVID-19 pandemic, with the EHF announcing the automatic qualification of the ten best-ranked teams in the EHF EURO 2020 that had not secured qualification.

Format
The whole qualification process was different from previous campaigns. Denmark as defending World Champions were already qualified and three best-ranked teams of the 2020 European Men's Handball Championship also booked their direct ticket. Other teams participated in this qualification campaign, which was split into several stages.

Qualification Phase 1 comprised the 15 teams which haven't qualified for the EHF EURO 2020. They were playing a group phase format in the October 2019 and January 2020, with three groups of four nations and one of three. The four group winners advanced to the next phase.

Qualification Phase 2 would have been consisted of two parts. Part 1 would have involved the four group winners from the Phase 1 alongside the four lowest-ranked EHF EURO 2020 teams, which do not take part in the 2020 IHF Men's Olympic Qualification Tournaments. Those eight teams would have played four matches in a two-legged play-off from 15 to 16 and 18 to 19 April 2020. The Part 2, played in June 2020, would have involved four Part 1 winners and the 16 remaining EHF EURO 2020 teams, which haven't qualified already for the final tournament.

Qualification Phase 1
The draw took place at the EHF Office on 23 July 2019.

Group 1
The group was played in a tournament format.

Group 2

Group 3
The group was played in a tournament format.

Group 4
The group was played in a tournament format.

Qualification Phase 2

Part 1
The four group winners from the first qualification phase joined the four lowest-ranked teams from the EHF EURO 2020 (not taking part in the 2020 Olympics qualification tournaments) in the first part of the second qualification phase, which would be played over two legs on 15 and 16 April and 18 and 19 April 2020.
The draw took place on 30 January 2020 at the EHF headquarters in Vienna, with the EHF EURO 2020 participants (Pot 1) hosting the teams from the first qualification phase (Pot 2) in the second leg.

The matches were cancelled on 24 April 2020.

Seeding pots

Overview
On 25 March, the EHF announced that no matches will be played before June due to the coronavirus pandemic.

|}

Part 2
In the second part of the second qualifying phase, the 16 teams from the EHF EURO 2020 not yet qualified for the final tournament (positions 4 to 20, excluding Denmark) would have joined the four aggregate winners of the first part of the second qualifying phase, which would have been played in home-and-away matches on 5 to 7 June and 9 to 11 June 2020. The ten aggregate winners would have advanced to the 2021 World Men's Handball Championship. The draw was held on 9 March 2020.

The matches were cancelled on 24 April 2020.

Seeding pots

Overview
The matches were rescheduled due to the coronavirus pandemic.

|}

References

External links
Eurohandball.com 

2018 in handball
2019 in handball
World Handball Championship tournaments
Qualification for handball competitions
World Men's Handball Championship - European Qualification
2020 in handball